Argenta is a village in Macon County, Illinois, United States, whose population was 913 at the 2020 census. It is included in the Decatur, Illinois Metropolitan Statistical Area.

Geography 
Argenta is located in northeastern Macon County at  (39.983996, -88.821076). Illinois Route 48 passes through the southeast side of the village, leading southwest  to Decatur, the county seat, and northeast  to Cisco.

Friends Creek, a south-flowing tributary of the Sangamon River, crosses the east end of the village.

Demographics 

As of the census of 2000, there were 921 people, 372 households, and 273 families residing in the village. The racial makeup of the village was 99.24% White, 0.11% African American, 0.22% Native American, 0.11% from other races, and 0.33% from two or more races. Hispanic or Latino of any race were 0.11% of the population.

There were 372 households, out of which 35.2% had children under the age of 18 living with them, 59.7% were married couples living together, 10.2% had a female householder with no husband present, and 26.6% were non-families. 24.7% of all households were made up of individuals, and 11.0% had someone living alone who was 65 years of age or older.  The average household size was 2.48 and the average family size was 2.96.

In the village, the population was spread out, with 26.5% under the age of 18, 8.4% from 18 to 24, 30.1% from 25 to 44, 22.3% from 45 to 64, and 12.8% who were 65 years of age or older.  The median age was 37 years.  For every 100 females, there were 100.2 males.  For every 100 females age 18 and over, there were 94.5 males.

The median income for a household in the village was $42,315, and the median income for a family was $49,028.  Males had a median income of $37,917 versus $23,214 for females.  The per capita income for the village was $18,154. About 1.9% of families and 3.7% of the population were below the poverty line, including 2.9% of those under age 18 and 10.0% of those age 65 or over.

Notable person
 Neva Gerber, silent-film actress

References

External links 

Villages in Macon County, Illinois
Villages in Illinois